Novick is a surname originating from Belarus which translates to "a newcomer to a place". The name has Czech and Slovakian origin as well. The Novick last name is most common in the United States, Israel and Argentina.

People
 William M Novick (born 1954) Pediatric heart surgeon
Edgardo Novick (born 1956), Uruguayan businessman and politician
Hernán Novick (born 1988), Uruguayan footballer
Irv Novick (1916–2004), American comic book artist
Jill Novick (born 1966), American actress
Kimberly A. Novick, American environmental scientist
Lynn Novick, American director and producer of documentary films
Marcel Novick (born 1983), Uruguayan footballer
Mason Novick (born 1974), American film producer and talent manager 
Melvin R. Novick (1932–1986), American statistician
Peter Novick (contemporary), American historian
Steve Novick (born 1963), American politician

Characters
Mike Novick, a character on the television series 24

See also
 Novik, a surname
 Edmond Novicki (born 1912), Polish-born French footballer
 Novickis, a surname

References